The International Racquetball Federation's 21st Racquetball World Championships were held in San Luis Potosi, Mexico from August 20-27, 2022. This was the first time Worlds was in Mexico since 2000, when it was also held in San Luis Potosi.

The 2022 World Championships used a best of five games match format with each game to 11 points, win by 2, with rally scoring, as used in other sports like squash and volleyball. Previously, racquetball games used side-out scoring, where players scored points only when they had won a rally which began with that player serving. Rallies won when not serving were simply side-outs: the rally losing player lost the serve and the rally winning player won the opportunity to serve, but did not win a point.

Bolivian Conrrado Moscoso won Men's Singles for the first time by defeating American Rocky Carson in the final, 8-11, 11-7, 11-4, 11-8. Moscoso is the first Bolivian (and first South American) to win Men's Singles at Worlds. The final was a rematch of the Men's Singles final at the 2014 Racquetball World Championships, when Carson defeated Moscoso to win the 4th of his record 5 Men's Singles World Championships. 2022 was the first time Carson had lost in a Men's Singles final at Worlds.

Tournament format
The 2022 World Championships used a two-stage format to determine the World Champions. Initially, players competed in separate groups over three days. The results were used to seed players for the medal round with only the top two players from each group advancing to the medal round.

Men’s singles

Preliminary round
Group 1

Group 2

Group 3

Group 4

Group 5

Group 6

Group 7

Medal round

Source:

References

External links
IRF website

Racquetball World Championships
Racquetball in Mexico
Racquetball competitions